Cerapachys (common names include "raider ant" and "ant-raiding ant") is a genus of ants in the subfamily Dorylinae. Species are mainly myrmecophagous ants which raid the nests of other ants for prey. The genus is distributed widely throughout the Indomalayan region.  The genus was revised by BoroWiec (2016) who split a number of previously synonymized genera out of Cerapachys, leaving only 5 species in the genus.

Species 

Cerapachys anokha 
Cerapachys antennatus 
Cerapachys aranus 
Cerapachys crawleyi 
Cerapachys edentatus 
Cerapachys incontentus 
Cerapachys latus 
Cerapachys lividus 
Cerapachys manni 
Cerapachys neotropicus 
Cerapachys princeps 
Cerapachys splendens 
Cerapachys sulcinodis 
Cerapachys wroughtoni 
Cerapachys xizangensis

References

External links 

Dorylinae
Ant genera